Pstrągowa  is a village in the administrative district of Gmina Czudec, within Strzyżów County, Subcarpathian Voivodeship, in south-eastern Poland.

The village has a population of 1900.

References

Villages in Strzyżów County